Faivre is a French surname.

Geographical distribution
As of 2014, 90.8% of all known bearers of the surname Faivre were residents of France (frequency 1:4,311), 3.7% of the United States (1:564,455) and 2.7% of Switzerland (1:17,361).

In France, the frequency of the surname was higher than national average (1:4,311) in the following regions:
 1. Bourgogne-Franche-Comté (1:447)
 2. Mayotte (1:1,888)
 3. French Polynesia (1:2,529)
 4. New Caledonia (1:2,936)
 5. Réunion (1:3,441)
 6. Grand Est (1:3,696)

People
 Antoine Faivre (born 1934), French scholar
 Florence Faivre (born 1983), Thai actress and model
 Guillaume Faivre (born 1987), Swiss football player
 Jacques Faivre (1932-2020), French football player
 Virginie Faivre (born 1982), Swiss skier

References

French-language surnames
Surnames of French origin